Papare is a form of music which originated in Sri Lanka. Adopted from Sinhala Baila music which in turn finds its roots in the Portuguese colonisation of the country. Papare is a very lively genre of music, and is a popular music culture throughout the South Asian region. There are a lot of papare bands in Sri Lanka that play mostly at cricket matches to boost the morale of supporters.

References

Sri Lankan music